Mesocerea is a genus of moths in the subfamily Arctiinae.

Species
 Mesocerea apicalis Rothschild, 1911
 Mesocerea distincta Rothschild, 1911

References

Natural History Museum Lepidoptera generic names catalog

Arctiinae